In Hungarian mythology, Prince Csaba was the youngest son of Attila, King of the Huns. A fierce and skilled warrior, he led the Huns to victory in all the battles they encountered over the ages. He is the legendary leader of the Székelys. 

But after Csaba's death, the Huns had no one to take his place. Seizing their chance, the enemies of the Huns launched an assault on the Hun kingdom. As they met on the field of battle, the enemy generals mocked the Huns, saying "and who will save you now that Csaba is gone?"
But no sooner had those words been spoken, a bright pathway consisting of stars appeared in the night sky and Csaba rode down at the head of an army from the heavens. Csaba and his army routed the Frankish invaders and saved the Huns once again, and three more times he returned down the "Skyway of the Warriors" to defend his people. According to some versions of the legend, he was seen once more several centuries later leading Árpád and the Hungarians, brother tribe of the Huns, over the Carpathians and into the land that is today known as Hungary.

Consequently, the meaning of the Hungarian name Csaba (Csaba - "A gift from the sky" or "A gift from the heavens") is said to have been derived from this legend.

Simon of Kéza and Mark of Kalt claimed that he was the legendary ancestor of the Aba clan; Mark additionally claimed that he was the legendary ancestor of the Árpád dynasty.

Family tree

According to Simon of Kéza's Gesta Hunnorum et Hungarorum and Mark of Kalt's Chronicon Pictum:

Notes

References

Hungarian mythology